Rehula or Řehula is a surname. Notable people with the surname include:

 Jan Řehula (born 1973), Czech triathlete
 Juha Rehula (born 1963), Finnish politician